Pier Paolo Capponi (9 June 1938 – 15 February 2018) was an Italian actor and screenwriter.

Life and career 
Born in Subiaco, after his studies Capponi attended a theater school and later was chosen by director Vittorio De Seta for an important role in Un uomo a metà.  His film career was divided equally between auteur films (with, among others, Paolo e Vittorio Taviani, Valerio Zurlini, Gérard Corbiau, Francesco Rosi and Nelo Risi) and genre films, in which he was sometimes credited as Norman Clark. On the big screen with some regularity for a decade, after 1977 Capponi focused his appearances on TV series and on stage.

Partial filmography 

 Our Man in Casablanca (1966) - Hermann von Heufen
 Almost a Man (1966) - Ugo
  (1966) - Man (uncredited)
 King of Hearts (1966) - Un Officier Anglais
 My Name Is Pecos (1966) - Joe Clane
 Mister X (1967) - Mister X
 The Subversives (1967) - Muzio
 Frame Up (1968) - O'Neil
 Black Jesus (1968) - Officer
 Il gatto selvaggio (1968)
 Commandos (1968) - Corbi
 Roma come Chicago (1968) - Director of Supermarket
 The Lady of Monza (1969) - Count Taverna
 Naked Violence (1969) - Duca
 Kill the Fatted Calf and Roast It (1970) - Il detective privato / The private detective
 Bocche cucite (1970) - Francesco
 Mafia Connection (1970) - Francesco Macaluso
 Many Wars Ago (1970) - Lieutenant Santini
 Defeat of the Mafia (1970) - Scott Luce
 Forbidden Photos of a Lady Above Suspicion (1970) - Peter
 The Cat o' Nine Tails (1971) - Police Supt. Spini
 Il sergente Klems (1971) - Mohamed Abdel Krim
 A Season in Hell (1971)
 Il était une fois un flic... (1972) - Ugo (uncredited)
 Seven Blood-Stained Orchids (1972) - Inspector Vismara
 Valerie Inside Outside (1972) - David Rocchi
 The Nun and the Devil (1973) - Don Carlos
 The Boss (1973) - Cocchi
 Diario di un italiano (1973) - Lorenzo
 Abbasso tutti, viva noi (1974) - Rufo
 The Last Desperate Hours (1974) - The Inspector
 La badessa di Castro (1974) - Monsignor Francesco Cittadini
 Delitto d'autore (1974) - Marco Girardi
 Blood and Diamonds (1977) - Tony
 Antonio Gramsci: The Days of Prison (1977) - Enrico
 Standard (1978)
 La posta in gioco (1988) - Attilio Matrangola
 Bankomatt (1989) - Impiegato banca
 A Season of Giants (1990, TV Movie) - Burchard
 Au nom du père et du fils (1992) - Salvatore
 L'urlo della verità (1992) - Marcello's father
 Fiorile (1993) - Duilio
 L'amore dopo (1993) - Antonov
 18000 giorni fa (1993) - Renzo Fraticelli
 Uno a me, uno a te e uno a Raffaele (1994) - The Lawyer
 Farinelli (1994) - Broschi
 The Bankers of God: The Calvi Affair (2002) - Roberto Rosone
 Legami di famiglia (2002)

References

External links 
 

1938 births
2018 deaths
People from Subiaco, Lazio
Italian male film actors
Italian male television actors
Italian male stage actors
Italian screenwriters
People of Lazian descent
Italian male screenwriters